Raúl Baptista (born 29 July 1911) was a Portuguese footballer who played as a half-back.

Starting at Barreirense, where he spent seven years, Baptista achieved recognition at Benfica, appearing in nearly 100 games and winning four major titles.

Career
Baptista arrived at Benfica in 1935 after seven seasons with Barreirense. He made his debut on 24 November, against Belenenses. With competition from João Correia, Albino and Gaspar Pinto, he only racked up 9 appearances, two in the Primeira Liga, allowing him to win his first league title. In the following year, he displaced Correia out of the first team and played 25 games on the way to back-to-back league titles. A year later, he completed a championship three-peat as regular first team, playing in all the league games and making 28 appearances in total.

In 1938–39, the breakthrough of Francisco Ferreira made a negative impact in his career, and he saw his playing time drop, to just 11 games. However, Baptista recovered his place in the first team in 1939–40, playing 20 games and winning the 1939–40 Taça de Portugal. The following year, he only played twice as Alcobia took his place in the starting eleven. He left Benfica with 95 appearances and four major wins.

Honours
Benfica
 Primeira Divisão: 1935–36, 1936–37, 1937–38
 Taça de Portugal: 1939–40

References
General
 

Specific

1911 births
Year of death unknown
Portuguese footballers
Association football midfielders
Primeira Liga players
F.C. Barreirense players
S.L. Benfica footballers